The Carnethy 5 is an annual hill race held in February, taking place in the Pentland Hills to the south of Edinburgh. Starting in a field near Silverburn, the route climbs five hills: Scald Law, South Black Hill, East Kip and West Kip are tackled before the final ascent to Carnethy Hill and the descent to the finish.

History
The first Carnethy Hill Race took place in 1971, with the idea coming from Jimmy Jardine of Peebles. The intention was to commemorate the Battle of Roslin which had been fought in the area in the early fourteenth century.

The inaugural event started and finished in Penicuik and only climbed Carnethy Hill. The next year, the course was extended to include Scald Law. In 1979, a ladies’ race took place over Carnethy only, the women having in previous years been restricted to a cross-country route round Penicuik Public Park. In 1980, the hill race was cancelled due to thick mist which led the police to feel that allowing the runners to cross the A702 road was unsafe. The organisers put on a two-lap cross-country race instead. However, only twenty-six men and women ran the cross-country course, with 103 others disregarding the cancellation decision and running the hill race. After this, the 1981 race was run over a new course which did not require the road crossing. This course was popular with the competitors and there was a consensus that the new route should be used in future years.

In 1986, the event was run with deep snow on the course, resulting in slow times.

The 1990 race was run in very poor weather with rain, wind and sleet. As some competitors were still being bussed to the start from the registration area after the official race start time, it was decided to let the bulk of the field set off to prevent the waiting runners getting dangerously cold, and the rest of the runners started twelve minutes later when the last ones had arrived. The fastest runner in the first group was Keith Anderson in 53:04 and the quickest in the second group was Andrew Peace in 52:51 but it was decided in the circumstances to consider the two as joint winners of the race.

The race has had around 500 competitors in recent years, making it one of the most popular hill or fell races and it is sometimes seen as the first major race of the season.

A considerable number of runners have completed the race twenty-one or more times, an accomplishment for which an engraved quaich is awarded. Jimmy Jardine holds the distinction of having done the race a total of forty-six times since 1971.

A junior race on Scald Law is held in conjunction with the Carnethy 5.

Results
The men’s course record is held by Gavin Bland with a time of 46:56 set in 1999. The women’s record is 54:20 by Angela Mudge in 2002. Mudge has the most wins, with fourteen between 1996 and 2013. Rob Jebb won the men’s race five times between 2002 and 2010.

The winners have been as follows.

Note 1: Gourley won the replacement cross-country race in 40:02 and Colin Donnelly won the unofficial hill race in which times were not recorded.

Note 2: There were two separate starts in 1990. The fastest runner in the first group was Keith Anderson in 53:04 and the fastest in the second group was Andrew Peace in 52:51.

References

Fell running competitions
Athletics competitions in Scotland
Sport in Midlothian
Recurring sporting events established in 1971
1971 establishments in Scotland